Miguel Ángel Troitiño Vinuesa (1947 – 2020) was a Spanish geographer, professor of human geography at the Complutense University of Madrid (UCM). He was an expert in cultural tourism and heritage preservation.

Biography 
Born in El Arenal, province of Ávila, Spain, in 1947, Troitiño earned a licentiate degree in Geography and History from the UCM. A lecturer at the UCM since 1973, he obtained a Chair of Human Geography in 1991.

During his career, he focused on fields such as tourism, cultural heritage, urban planning and territorial development. A great deal of his scholar production dealt with the city of Cuenca.

He died from COVID-19 duringbthe COVID-19 pandemic in Spain on 21 April 2020.

References 

Academic staff of the Complutense University of Madrid
Complutense University of Madrid alumni
Spanish geographers
1947 births
2020 deaths
Deaths from the COVID-19 pandemic in Spain